Nacionalni stroj (Serbian Cyrillic: Национални строј, National Alignment) was a neo-Nazi organization in Serbia, based on the Vojvodina Region. It had orchestrated several incidents since 2005. In late 2005, charges were pressed against 18 of the leading members in Novi Sad, and each of the suspects were facing up to eight years in prison. It was banned in Serbia in 2011.

See also
 Serbian nationalism

References

Neo-Nazism in Serbia
Gangs in Serbia
Serbian nationalism
Politics of Vojvodina
Far-right politics in Serbia